Dollna Goricë (Macedonian and Bulgarian: Долна Горица), formerly Goricë e Vogël, is a village on the western shore of Lake Prespa in the Pustec Municipality which is officially recognised as a Macedonian minority zone located in the Korçë County in Albania. According to Bulgarian sources, including research by a Bulgarian scientist from Albania, the local inhabitants are Bulgarians.

History
A survey in the late 19th century found Dolna Gorica to consist of 75 houses and 67 male Bulgarian Orthodox residents. In 1900, Vasil Kanchov gathered and compiled statistics on demographics in the area and reported that the village of Dolna Goritsa was inhabited by about 42 Bulgarian Christians.

In February 1996, the village hosted a conference attended by officials from the Republic of Macedonia on the subject of the ethnic Macedonian minority in Albania. In 2013, the village's official name was changed from "Goricë e Vogël" to "Dolna Gorica".

Demographics
A 2007 estimate put the village's population at 550.

Culture
In 2002, a library opened in the village consisting of primarily Macedonian-language books.

A monument commemorating the ethnic Macedonian refugees of the Greek Civil War was unveiled in the village in May, 2013.

Dolna Gorica is home to the annual "Day of Wine" event, occurring each December.

References

Populated places in Pustec Municipality
Villages in Korçë County
Macedonian communities in Albania